Ricochet Days is the third album by Modern English, released in 1984 by 4AD in the United Kingdom, Vertigo Records in Canada, and Sire Records in the United States. The album peaked at number 93 on the Billboard 200.

Reception 

AllMusic reviewer Alex Ogg gave Ricochet Days a mixed review, saying that it Began Modern English's "slow decline toward the status of just another synth band." He warned readers that "The material, though beautifully produced by the reliable Hugh Jones and boasting some pliable hooks, lacks the conviction and attack of old. "Hands Across the Sea" and "Spinning Me Round" are serviceable but hardly vital additions to the band's songbook."

Track listing 
All songs written and arranged by Richard Brown, Michael Conroy, Robbie Grey, Gary McDowell, and Stephen Walker.

Personnel 
Modern English
Robbie Grey – vocals
Gary McDowell – guitars
Stephen Walker – keyboards
Michael Conroy – bass, violin
Richard Brown – drums, percussion

Additional personnel
Hugh Jones – additional keyboards, backing vocals, production, engineering

References

External links 

1984 albums
Modern English (band) albums
Albums produced by Hugh Jones (producer)
Sire Records albums
4AD albums